Luis Vigoreaux Lorenzana (born July 1, 1951) is a Puerto Rican actor and producer. He is the son of Luis Vigoreaux, a Puerto Rican media personality and Rosaura Lorenzana Vilches. He is the brother of Roberto Vigoreaux, local senator, television producer, actor, singer, marketing executive, telecommunications technician and entrepreneur.

Personal life
Vigoreaux enjoys a close friendship with José Carlos Agrelot, the elder son of Puerto Rican comedian José Miguel Agrelot. Their fathers were best friends and working together at a show the day Luisito and José Jr. were born. Vigoreaux and Jose Jr. were born in the same hospital on the same day. Both of their fathers were eventually buried at the same cemetery after their deaths, just metres from each other.

Vigoreaux and his brother Roberto were deeply impacted by the premature death of their mother, Rosaura, due to cancer when they were young. Their father, Luis Vigoreaux, began a relationship with actress Lydia Echevarria while he and his first wife, Rosaura, were still married. Their father eventually left their mother for Echevarria, a fact that caused much friction in the Vigoreaux home. Through his father, Vigoreaux has two other siblings; sisters Vanessa Vigoreaux, an occasional theatrical actress, and Glendalys Vigoreaux.

Vigoreaux followed his younger brother, who began acting as a child for Disney, into acting. As they came of age, both Vigoreaux brothers, Luisito particularly, worked closely with their father on his TV productions.

Luis Vigoreaux Sr.'s Death

In January 1983 Vigoreaux's father was found murdered, burned to death inside the trunk of his car. At the time, Vigoreaux had been working with his father on a new TV show named A Millón, for WAPA-TV. Aspiring to become a producer, Vigoreaux was to assist his father with production for the show; however, with his father's death, he became the show's main producer. Under Vigoreaux, A Millón, became the #1 game show for several years, hosted by Hector Marcano, Sonia Noemí, and Rafael Jose.

In 1984, Vigoreaux's stepmother Echevarría was accused of the murder of Luis Vigoreaux as a conspirator. Vigoreaux and his brother's contempt for their step-mother became obvious when they opposed the commutation of her sentence. Governor Pedro Rossello eventually commuted her 208-year sentence, after serving 13 years.

Puerto Rican tabloids have speculated about the relationship between Vigoreaux, Roberto, and their sisters. Many believed due to their extensive history, there was friction, which Vigoreaux denied. Vigoreaux and his sisters have appeared together on public outings on several occasions. On July 15, 2008, Vigoreaux's sister Glendalys committed suicide in Glendale, Arizona .

Relationships
Long after his divorce from second wife, Marisol Gallisá, Vigoreaux married Dana Miró, also a show host and daughter of Telemundo Puerto Rico's show host Eddie Miró.

Role as a media producer

It wasn't until 1984 that Vigoreaux stepped into the public light when he co-hosted a daily game show with his brother Roberto called Parejo, Doble y Triple (Square, Double and Triple), at WAPA-TV. Vigoreaux's appearance on this show dramatically increased his popularity within Puerto Rico.

In 1986, both Luisito and his brother Roberto appeared in a Burger King commercial for the Puerto Rican market, where they acted and sang.

Vigoreaux went on to host other shows such as Sabado en Grande (Big Saturday, also with Roberto), El Show del Mediodía (The Midday Show) and De Magazin, one of several successful media partnerships with talent agent and former beauty queen Desiree Lowry. He has since hosted, co-hosted and/or produced several other shows since then, both on television and radio. His most controversial show has been Sunshine's Café, a comedy show starring Sunshine Logroño that aired in the mid-1980s.

Vigoreaux co-hosted a TV show named Ruben & Co. along with Millie Cangiano.

, he is a co-host of a cooking show named "Conecta'os por la Cocina" along with Bizcocho, another legendary Puerto Rican television personality.

The "Vigoreaux Trademark"
Vigoreaux is famous for his sometimes self-deprecating sense of humor and blatant frankness. After being convicted once of a DUI charge in 1989, he was parodied by fellow actors, who even played Pedro Flores' "Borracho No Vale" ("Being Drunk Doesn't Count") as a theme song for Luisito. Not only did he play along with the joke, he refers humorously to the conviction to this day.

Vigoreaux is also known for using profanity occasionally in public. This, plus his uncompromising attitude, has earned him the reputation of being Puerto Rican television's enfant terrible; a title which he is reportedly proud of. Because both Vigoreaux and his brother have humorous tendencies to be foul-mouthed they've earned the "El Vigoreaux Trademark" designation by fellow entertainers. Sunshine Logroño jokingly refers to Vigoreaux as "Luisito 'Satanás' (Satan) Vigoreaux".

See also

List of Puerto Ricans
French immigration to Puerto Rico
List of television presenters/Puerto Rico

References

1951 births
Living people
Puerto Rican male actors
Puerto Rican comedians
Puerto Rican people of French descent
Puerto Rican television hosts
Vigoreaux, Lusisito
Puerto Rican television producers